Pineville is a home rule-class city in Bell County, Kentucky, United States. It is the seat of its county. The population was 1,732 as of the 2010 census. It is located on a small strip of land between the Cumberland River and Pine Mountain.

History
Pineville is one of the oldest settlements in Kentucky, located at the crossing of the Cumberland River by the Wilderness Road. It was established as Cumberland Ford in 1781 and formed part of Governor Isaac Shelby's land tracts. When Bell County was formed in 1867, Cumberland Ford was formally laid off; local landowner J.J. Gibson's 1869 land grant permitted it to be selected as the county seat, but the courthouse was not completed until 1871. The settlement was renamed "Pineville" in 1870 and formally incorporated in 1873.

One of the earliest branches of the Sojourner Truth Woman's Christian Temperance Union (WCTU) was formed in Pineville in 1906 with 15 members - at the time, it was affiliated with the white women's branch of the Kentucky WCTU.

Its riverside location has made it subject to flooding, including a devastating incident on April 4, 1977, in which a floodwall built in 1952 was overwhelmed and 200 houses were destroyed or damaged. The U.S. Army Corps of Engineers upgraded the floodwall in 1988.

The economy is dependent on the coal mining industry, local family owned businesses and on tourism. Many enjoy visiting Pine Mountain State Resort Park, where the popular attraction "Chained Rock" is located. Thanks to works done by the community organization Main Street Pineville, the town is working on revitalizing downtown Pineville to its historical roots.

Every Memorial Day weekend (from Wednesday to Sunday) the town of Pineville welcomes all to the Kentucky Mountain Laurel Festival, named for the Mountain Laurel flower which grows wild on Pine Mountain. The first Kentucky Mountain Laurel Festival was presented in 1931 at the suggestion of Annie Walker Burns, a descendant of Dr. Thomas Walker, the first European to enter Kentucky and who, along with a party of explorers, visited the present site of Pineville in 1750. Burns was captivated by the history and beauty surrounding Pineville and appealed to Governor Flem D. Sampson of Barbourville to initiate some type of event to honor Dr. Walker. She gained the support of other influential Bell Countians, and the 1931 Festival was staged at Clear Creek Springs on June 4.

Geography
Pineville is located in northern Bell County at  (36.7620301, −83.6949176), along the Cumberland River, directly north of its water gap through Pine Mountain. U.S. Route 25E passes through the city, intersecting Kentucky Route 66 in downtown. U.S. Route 119 has its southern terminus at US 25E near the southern border of the city.

Education
The city is served by Pineville Independent Schools. Schools located within the district include:
Pineville High School
Pineville Middle School
Pineville Elementary School

Southeast Kentucky Community and Technical College maintains a campus in Pineville, serving as the only post-secondary education institution in the city. However Clear Creek Baptist Bible College is located in Pineville's zip code and is located south of the city.

Pineville has a public library, a branch of the Bell County Public Library District.

Demographics
As of the census of 2000, there were 2,093 people, 871 households, and 518 families residing in the city. There were 961 housing units at an average density of about 667 per square mile (257.7/km). The racial makeup of the city was 92.74% White, 4.30% African American, 0.24% Native American, 0.24% Asian, 0.14% from other races, and 2.34% from two or more races. Hispanic or Latino of any race were 0.91% of the population.

There were 871 households, out of which 27.6% had children under the age of 18 living with them, 34.6% were married couples living together, 20.8% had a female householder with no husband present, and 40.5% were non-families. 38.6% of all households were made up of individuals, and 20.1% had someone living alone who was 65 years of age or older. The average household size was 2.17 and the average family size was 2.90.

In the city, the population was spread out, with 22.5% under the age of 18, 8.6% from 18 to 24, 24.2% from 25 to 44, 24.9% from 45 to 64, and 19.8% who were 65 years of age or older. The median age was 40 years. For every 100 females, there were 82.0 males. For every 100 females age 18 and over, there were 76.1 males.

The median income for a household in the city was $12,435, and the median income for a family was $20,625. Males had a median income of $24,125 versus $23,229 for females. The per capita income for the city was $12,692. About 37.1% of families and 44.2% of the population were below the poverty line, including 58.8% of those under age 18 and 30.0% of those age 65 or over.

The Kentucky Mountain Laurel Festival
The Kentucky Mountain Laurel Festival began in 1931 and has been held annually except for during WWII (1942–1947). Mountain Laurel is a shrub with large clusters of small pale pink flowers that grows wild in the mountains of Appalachia. The Mountain Laurel Festival is deeply rooted in southern tradition, mountain heritage and held dear to all natives of Pineville. The 85th Festival was held during May 20–24, 2015.

The Kentucky Mountain Laurel Festival includes a Concert, carnival, Appalachian crafts, local talent, a Gala Parade and a beauty pageant. Senior girls from local High Schools compete for the title of the Mountain Laurel Princess. Queen Candidates, young women chosen to represent their respective Universities in Kentucky are welcomed into the homes of Pineville citizens in the truest form of Southern Hospitality. Throughout the weekend, the women are judged secretly based on the standards of a Southern Lady.

On Saturday after the Parade, a Coronation begins in the Laurel Cove, a natural amphitheater in the Pine Mountain State Park. Each Queen candidate must curtsy before the Governor as the audience dressed in their absolute best, many wearing hats normally reserved for the Kentucky Derby claps and 'ahhs' at the magnificent dresses. Then with a precession of the miniature and high school Courts, the Queen is named. She is then crowned by the Governor of Kentucky with a tiara made of live, delicate, pink Mountain Laurels. That night a 'Grand March' occurs in true southern fashion, the Queens and their escorts elegantly dance together after recognizing their new Kentucky Mountain Laurel Festival Queen.

See also
 Bell County, Kentucky
 Bell County High School
 Clear Creek Baptist Bible College
 Kentucky Route 2014 Bridge
 Pine Mountain State Resort Park
 Middlesborough, KY Micropolitan Statistical Area

Climate
The climate in this area is characterized by hot, humid summers and generally mild to cool winters. According to the Köppen Climate Classification system, Pineville has a humid subtropical climate, abbreviated "Cfa" on climate maps.

Notable people
Dale Ann Bradley, Grammy-nominated singer/musician
 George Blowers, banker
 John Hoskins, rear admiral in the United States Navy
 Rodney McMullen, businessman; CEO of The Kroger Company
 Reid Patterson, swimmer
 Joseph Chilton Pearce, author and lecturer
 Shanda Sharer, murder victim

References

External links
 City of Pineville official website

 
Cities in Bell County, Kentucky
Cities in Kentucky
County seats in Kentucky
Populated places established in 1781